Dilazep is a vasodilator that acts as an adenosine reuptake inhibitor.

It is used for the treatment of cardiopathy and renal disorders.

Synthesis

The reaction of bis-(3-hydroxypropyl)-ethylene diamine (1) with 1-Bromo-3-chloropropane (2) gives homopiperazine [19970-80-0] 
(3). Esterification by reaction with 3,4,5-Trimethoxybenzoyl Chloride [4521-61-3] (4) completed the synthesis of Dilazep (5).

See also
 Hexobendine, a drug with similar chemical structure

References 

Vasodilators
Pyrogallol ethers
Benzoate esters
Diazepanes
Adenosine reuptake inhibitors